Portugal first participated at the Olympic Games in 1912 and has since taken part in every edition of the Summer Olympic Games. Earlier that year, the Olympic Committee of Portugal (COP, Comité Olímpico de Portugal) was recognised by the International Olympic Committee as the Portuguese National Olympic Committee. In 1952, athletes representing Portugal competed for the first time at the Olympic Winter Games, and have only missed two editions since 1988.

As of the 2020 Summer Olympics, thirty-nine Portuguese athletes have won a total of twenty-eight medals (five golds, nine silvers and fourteen bronzes) in nine summer sports. Athletics has provided the most medals, including all five golds. Portugal has not yet won any medal at the Winter Olympics.

Medal tables

Medals by Summer Games

Medals by Winter Games

Medals by summer sport

List of medalists 
A total of 39 athletes won 28 medals for Portugal. Only five athletes won more than one medal: Luís Mena e Silva (two bronzes), Carlos Lopes (one gold and one silver), Rosa Mota (one gold and one bronze), Fernanda Ribeiro (one gold and one bronze) and Fernando Pimenta (one silver and one bronze).

See also
 List of flag bearers for Portugal at the Olympics
 Portugal at the Paralympics
 Sport in Portugal

External links